is a railway station in Hōfu, Yamaguchi Prefecture, Japan, operated by West Japan Railway Company (JR West).

Lines
Daidō Station is served by the Sanyō Main Line.

See also
 List of railway stations in Japan

External links

  

Railway stations in Yamaguchi Prefecture
Sanyō Main Line
Railway stations in Japan opened in 1900
Hōfu, Yamaguchi